Kwame Gyekye (10 November 1939 – 13 April 2019) was a Ghanaian philosopher, and an important figure in the development of modern African philosophy. Gyekye was an emeritus professor of philosophy at the University of Ghana, and a visiting professor of philosophy and African-American studies at Temple University. He is known for theorizing the concept of person-hood on the basis of Akan cultural paradigm in debate with Kwasi Wiredu, which is seen as one of the defining moments of modern African philosophy.

Biography 
He was educated at Mfantsipim School. Gyekye studied first at the University of Ghana, then at Harvard University, where he obtained his Ph.D. with a thesis on Græco–Arabic philosophy.  He was a Fellow of the Smithsonian Institution's Woodrow Wilson International Center for Scholars, and is a life-time Fellow of the Ghana Academy of Arts and Sciences.

Philosophical work

Person and community
Gyekye challenges the view that in African thought, community confers personhood on the individual and thus the individual's identity is merely derivative of the community. He attributes this view to African philosopher Ifeanyi Menkiti, as well as socialist political figures like Ghana's Kwame Nkrumah, Senegal's Léopold Senghor, and Tanzania's Julius Nyerere.

Instead, Gyekye argues that African thought ascribes definite value to the individual.  He cites an Akan proverb, "All persons are children of God; no one is a child of the earth" in support of his argument that a person is conceived as a theomorphic being, having in their nature an aspect of God.  This soul (known as okra to the Akan) is described as divine and originating with God.  Thus, he argues, a person is viewed as more than just a material or physical object, but children of God, and therefore intrinsically valuable.  This intrinsic value, it is argued, makes nonsense of the view that the individual's value stems solely from the community.  Similarly, he argues that the person is conceived as a unique individual (as in the proverb "antelope's soul is one, duiker's another"), so that each individual is self-complete, and the reality of the person cannot be derivative and posterior to that of the community.

While Gyekye argues that the individual is ontologically complete, he also acknowledges that people live in community, as in the proverb, "When a person descends from heaven, he/she descends into a human society."  In his view, a person's abilities are not sufficient for survival, so that community is necessary for the survival of the individual, as articulated in the proverb, "A person is not a palm tree that he/she should be self-sufficient."

Thus, he argues, it is an error to hold that African philosophy denies the individual, but instead, the individual is an intrinsically valuable child of God, intricately linked into a web of human relationships.  He cites a Ghanaian artist who wrote, "we are linked together like a chain; we are linked in life, we are linked in death; persons who share a common blood relation never break away from one another."

Bibliography
1975: "Philosophical relevance of Akan proverbs" (Second Order: An African Journal of Philosophy 4:2, pp. 45–53)
1977: "Akan language and the materialism thesis: a short essay on the relations between philosophy and language" (Studies in Language 1:1, pp 237 44)
1978: "Akan concept of a person" (International Philosophical Quarterly 18:3, pp. 277–87)
1987: An Essay on African Philosophical Thought: The Akan Conceptual Scheme
(Cambridge: Cambridge University Press)
1995: revised edition (Philadelphia: Temple University Press) 
1988: The Unexamined Life: Philosophy and the African Experience (Ghana Universities Press)
1991: "Man as a moral subject: the perspective of an African philosophical anthropology" in The Quest for Man: The Topicality of Philosophical Anthropology, ed. Joris van Nispens & Douwe Tiemersma (Assen/Maastricht, Netherlands: VanGorcum)
1992a: (ed. Gyekye & Kwasi Wiredu) Person and Community: Ghanaian Philosophical Studies 1 (Washington D.C.: The Council for Research in Values and Philosophy)
1992b: "Person and Community" in 1992a
1992c: "Traditional political ideas and values" in 1992a
1995: "Aspects of African communitarian thought" (The Responsive Community: Rights and Responsibilities)

Secondary literature 
"A Defense of Kwame Gyekye’s Moderate Communitarianism", Kibujjo M. Kalumba, Philosophical Papers Volume 49, 2020 - Issue 1.
"Ethical Thought of Kwasi Wiredu and Kwame Gyekye", George Kotei Neequaye, The Palgrave Handbook of African Social Ethics.
"The apparent conflict of transcendentalism and immanentism In Kwame Gyekye And Kwasi Wiredu's interpretation of the Akan concept of God", Ada Agada, Filosofia Theoretica Journal of African Philosophy Culture and Religions 6(1):23-38
A Critical Exposition of Kwame Gyekye's Communitarianism,  O. S. Mwimnobi, Master of Arts thesis submitted in the University of South Africa (2003).

References

External links 

 Akan Philosophy of the Person, on the debate between Gyekye and Wiredu, Stanford Encyclopedia of Philosophy.

Ghanaian philosophers
University of Ghana alumni
Harvard Graduate School of Arts and Sciences alumni
Temple University faculty
1939 births
Mfantsipim School alumni
Academic staff of the University of Ghana
2019 deaths
Fellows of the Ghana Academy of Arts and Sciences